The Malkh were supposedly an ancient nation, living in the Western/Central North Caucasus. They are usually regarded as the westernmost Nakh people, and their name has a Nakh root (Malkh, the sun, attached to the main God, Deela's name as well, see Vainakh mythology). It is believed that the Chechen teip Malkhi derives from them, although the existence of the Malkh nation is strongly doubted.

History
Unlike the Durdzuks, the Malkh seem to have to set up a monarchy (possibly after the escalation of the threat of the Scythians and Sarmatians). The Malkh state had a king, who called himself an "emperor".

By the 5th century BCE, the Nakh nations of the North Caucasus (Malkhs in the West, Dzurdzuks in the East, as well as other Nakh tribes such as the Gligvs, "Kists", Khamekits, and Sadiks, though the boundaries between many of these peoples was fuzzy and unsure) were turning to larger states for assistance against the northern nomadic invaders. While the Dvals and Dzurdzuks allied themselves to Colchis and Iberia, the Malkh Kingdom became strong allies of the Greek Bosporan Kingdom. In 480 BC, Adermakh, king of the Malkh Kingdom, married a daughter of the Bosporan king. The later history of the Malkh is unknown.

References

Nakh peoples
Bosporan Kingdom